Jan Władysław Król (born June 24, 1950 in Mielec) is a Polish economist and politician, former member of Sejm.

A graduate of Cracow University of Economics, he was elected to Contract Sejm in 1989 from Solidarity. He served following three terms from Democratic Union and Freedom Union. He was a Sejm Member from 1989 to 2001.

Król served as a Sejm Vice-Marshal from 1997 to 2001.

In 2001 parliamentary election he lost his seat.

References

1950 births
Living people
People from Mielec
PAX Association members
Democratic Union (Poland) politicians
Freedom Union (Poland) politicians
Deputy Marshals of the Sejm of the Third Polish Republic
Members of the Polish Sejm 1991–1993
Members of the Polish Sejm 1993–1997
Members of the Polish Sejm 1997–2001